Jari Schuurman (born 22 February 1997) is a Dutch professional footballer who plays as a midfielder for FC Dordrecht.

Club career

Feyenoord
Schuurman made his senior debut on 8 May 2016, coming on as 87th-minute substitute for Tonny Vilhena in a 1–0 Eredivisie win over NEC. He played this one match for Feyenoord. He moved to Willem II on a loan for the 2016–17 season, and the season after moved to NEC on a loan.

FC Dordrecht
On 30 January 2019, Schuurman moved to FC Dordrecht on a loan for the remainder of the 2018–19 season. After the season, he signed a three-year contract at the club.

International career
Schuurman represented Dutch youth teams at U15, U16, U17, and U19 levels.

Career statistics

Club

Honours

Club
Feyenoord
 KNVB Cup: 2015–16
 Johan Cruyff Shield: 2018

References

External links

 

1997 births
Living people
Dutch footballers
Netherlands youth international footballers
Association football midfielders
Eredivisie players
Eerste Divisie players
Feyenoord players
Willem II (football club) players
NEC Nijmegen players
FC Dordrecht players
Footballers from Gorinchem